The Roman Catholic Archdiocese of Nazianzus is a titular see of the Catholic Church. Both Western Catholic and the Eastern Catholic bishops have been assigned to this diocese. The most famous of which being Saint Gregory of Nazianzus.

Past and Present Ordinaries

 Saint Gregory of Nazianzus - (374 Appointed - 375 Resigned)
 Marcus (Avunculus) Vetter - (1546 Appointed - Nov 1554 Died)
 Girolamo Ragazzoni - (15 Jan 1561 Appointed -)
 Francesco Maria Enrici - (1574 Appointed - 29 Nov 1577 Appointed, Bishop of Senigallia)
 Etienne Weinberger, O.F.M. - (27 Jan 1620 Appointed - 1625 Died)
 Charles-Maurice Le Tellier - (3 Sep 1668 Appointed - 3 Aug 1671 Succeeded, Archbishop of Reims)
 Giuseppe Mosti - (16 Dec 1675 Appointed - 29 Jul 1692 Died)
 Alessandro Bonaventura - (23 Feb 1711 Appointed - 7 Feb 1721 Died)
 Nicolò Maria Lercari - (12 Jun 1724 Appointed - 16 Dec 1726 Installed, Cardinal-Priest of Santi Giovanni e Paolo)
 Giovanni Minotto Ottoboni - (16 Dec 1726 Appointed - 8 Feb 1730 Appointed, Archbishop (Personal Title) of Padova {Padua})
 Marcello Passari (5 Mar 1731 Appointed - 2 Dec 1733 Installed, Cardinal-Priest of Santa Maria in Ara Coeli)
 Marcello Crescenzi (14 Jul 1739 Appointed - 16 Dec 1743 Installed, Cardinal-Priest of Santa Maria in Traspontina)
 Enrico Enríquez - (16 Dec 1743 Appointed - 22 Jul 1754 Installed, Cardinal-Priest of Sant’Eusebio)
 Giovanni Maria Benzoni - (11 Sep 1754 Appointed - 8 Jan 1757 Died)
 Giovanni Battista Bortoli - (28 Mar 1757 Appointed - 14 Mar 1776 Died)
 Ottavio Boni - (18 Jul 1783 Appointed - 3 Mar 1808 Died)
 Michele Belli - (26 Sep 1814 Appointed - 3 Mar 1822 Died)
 Giacomo Filippo Fransoni - (27 Sep 1822 Appointed - 23 Jun 1828 Appointed, Cardinal-Priest of Santa Maria in Ara Coeli)
 Giacomo Luigi Brignole - (15 Mar 1830 Appointed - 23 Jun 1834 Appointed, Cardinal-Priest of San Giovanni a Porta Latina)
 Antonio Maria Traversi - (11 Jul 1836 Appointed - 21 Feb 1839 Appointed, Titular Patriarch of Constantinople)
 Giovanni Battista de Albertis - (17 Dec 1840 Appointed - 4 Jan 1862 Died)
 Josyf Sembratowicz - (24 Mar 1865 Appointed - 27 Jun 1870 Confirmed, Archbishop of Lviv (Ukrainian))
 Roger William Bede Vaughan, O.S.B. - (28 Feb 1873 Appointed - 16 Mar 1877 Succeeded, Archbishop of Sydney)
 Angelo Di Pietro - (28 Dec 1877 Appointed - 15 Jun 1893 Appointed, Cardinal-Priest of Santi Bonifacio ed Alessio)
 Beniamino Cavicchioni - (11 Jan 1894 Appointed - 25 Jun 1903 Appointed, Cardinal-Priest of Santa Maria in Ara Coeli)
 Angelo Maria Dolci - (9 Dec 1906 Appointed - 27 Jan 1911 Appointed, Archbishop of Amalfi)
 Dionysius Antonius Schüler, O.F.M. - (27 Oct 1911 Appointed - 7 Sep 1926 Died)
 Agostino Mancinelli - (30 Jun 1931 Appointed - 5 Dec 1933 Succeeded, Bishop of Aquino, Sora, e Pontecorvo)
 Bernardo Bertoglio - (3 Feb 1934 Appointed - 15 Feb 1937 Appointed, Bishop of Bobbio (Abbey of San Colombano))
 Salvatore Rotolo, S.D.B. - (5 Oct 1937 Appointed - 20 Oct 1969 Died)
 Demetrius Martin Greschuk - (27 Jun 1974 Appointed - 28 Apr 1986 Appointed, Bishop of Edmonton (Ukrainian))
 Miguel Mykycej, F.D.P. (23 Jun 1990 Appointed - 24 Apr 1999 Appointed, Bishop of Santa María del Patrocinio en Buenos Aires (Ukrainian))

References

Titular sees